The following is List of Universities and Colleges in Guizhou.

References
List of Chinese Higher Education Institutions — Ministry of Education
List of Chinese universities, including official links
Guizhou Institutions Admitting International Students

 
Guizhou